Moonbeam Films is a family-oriented brand sub-brand of Charles Band's Full Moon Features that is the revived successor to the former Moonbeam Entertainment and Pulsepounders. It distributes family-oriented sci-fi and fantasy films from the past originally released by Moonbeam Entertainment onto DVDs, with some carrying alternative release titles. Some films put out by this distributor were originally released by different companies associated with Paramount Pictures from 1990 until 2015.

List of film releases

Some films received alternate titles when re-released onto DVD. To avoid confusion, both titles are listed here.

References

External links
 Official website

Film production companies of the United States
American companies established in 2012
San Fernando Valley
Film distributors of the United States
Sibling filmmakers